The Queen's Knickers Award is a British award for a children's illustrated book. It was founded in 2020 and is awarded annually by the Society of Authors for "an outstanding children's original illustrated book for ages 0-7". It is funded by children's author Nicholas Allan and takes its name from his book The Queen's Knickers (1993,).

Past winners
Past winners of the prize have been:

2020
Winner: 
Runner-Up:

2021
Winner: 
 Runner-up:

2022
Winner:

References

Illustrated book awards
British children's literary awards